Fubar Age of Computer is a Canadian mockumentary television series based on the films of the same name. Starring David Lawrence and Paul J. Spence, the series premiered on Viceland on November 3, 2017 and on City on November 5, 2017.

Premise
After fleeing wildfires in Fort McMurray, Alberta, Terry and Dean discover the Internet for the first time.

Cast and characters
 David Lawrence as Terry Cahill
 Paul J. Spence as Dean Murdoch
 North Darling as Shank
 Maxime D. Pomerleau as Jacinthe Ouellette
 Terra Hazelton as Trish Cahill
 Andrew Sparacino as Tron

Series overview

Season 1 (2017)

Reception
John Semley of The Globe and Mail said "Much of Age of Computer's humour – from its jokes about real-world wildfires to sight gags about way-too-steep wheelchair ramps – may strike many people as galling. But as in the previous, big screen Fubar adventures, Terry and Dean's beautiful obliviousness produces a genuine sympathy."

According to Google 91% of its users liked Fubar Age of Computer.

References

External links
Official Viceland site

2010s Canadian satirical television series
2010s Canadian sitcoms
2017 Canadian television series debuts
Canadian mockumentary television series
Citytv original programming
Viceland original programming
Television shows set in Calgary